

Buildings in Mississippi taller than 300 ft (91 m)

See also
List of tallest buildings in Biloxi
List of tallest buildings in Jackson, Mississippi

References

Tallest
Mississippi